The 1992–93 NBA season was the 23rd season for the Portland Trail Blazers in the National Basketball Association. The Trail Blazers entered the season as runners-up in the 1992 NBA Finals, where they lost to the Chicago Bulls in six games. In the off-season, the team signed free agents Rod Strickland, and Mario Elie. The Blazers got off to a fast start winning their first eight games of the season, and held a 31–16 record at the All-Star break. However, Clyde Drexler only played just 49 games due to knee and hamstring injuries. The Blazers finished the season with a 51–31 record, third in the Pacific Division and fourth in the Western Conference. It was their 11th straight trip to the postseason.

Drexler averaged 19.9 points, 6.3 rebounds, 5.7 assists and 1.9 steals per game, while Clifford Robinson averaged 19.1 points and 6.6 rebounds per game off the bench, was named Sixth Man of the Year, and also finished in fifth place in Most Improved Player voting, and Terry Porter provided the team with 18.2 points and 5.2 assists per game. In addition, Strickland provided with 13.7 points, 7.2 assists and 1.7 steals per game, while Jerome Kersey contributed 10.6 points and 6.2 rebounds per game, Kevin Duckworth provided with 9.9 points and 5.2 rebounds per game, and Buck Williams averaged 8.3 points and 8.4 rebounds per game. Drexler and Porter were both selected for the 1993 NBA All-Star Game.

However, the Blazers were unable to follow the previous season's run to the NBA Finals, as they fell to the 5th-seeded San Antonio Spurs in the Western Conference First Round of the playoffs, 3–1. Following the season, Duckworth was traded to the Washington Bullets after his production had decreased in the previous two seasons, and Elie was dealt to the Houston Rockets.

NBA Draft

Roster

Regular season

Season standings

z - clinched division title
y - clinched division title
x - clinched playoff spot

Record vs. opponents

Game log

Playoffs

| home_wins = 1
| home_losses = 1
| road_wins = 0
| road_losses = 2
}}
|- align="center" bgcolor="#ffcccc"
| 1
| April 29
| San Antonio
| L 86–87
| Jerome Kersey (24)
| Jerome Kersey (9)
| Rod Strickland (9)
| Memorial Coliseum12,888
| 0–1
|- align="center" bgcolor="#ccffcc"
| 2
| May 1
| San Antonio
| W 105–96
| Clyde Drexler (21)
| Rod Strickland (8)
| Rod Strickland (9)
| Memorial Coliseum12,888
| 1–1
|- align="center" bgcolor="#ffcccc"
| 3
| May 5
| @ San Antonio
| L 101–107
| Clyde Drexler (19)
| Buck Williams (7)
| Rod Strickland (9)
| HemisFair Arena16,057
| 1–2
|- align="center" bgcolor="#ffcccc"
| 4
| May 7
| @ San Antonio
| L 97–100 (OT)
| Mark Bryant (21)
| Jerome Kersey (14)
| Rod Strickland (10)
| HemisFair Arena16,057
| 1–3
|-

Player statistics

NOTE: Please write the players statistics in alphabetical order by last name.

Season

Playoffs

Awards and honors
 Clyde Drexler, NBA All-Star
 Terry Porter, NBA All-Star
 Clifford Robinson, NBA Sixth Man of the Year

Transactions

References

Portland Trail Blazers seasons
Portland Trail Blazers 1992
Portland Trail Blazers 1992
Port
Port
Port